1938 Országos Bajnokság I (men's water polo) was the 32nd water polo championship in Hungary. There were nine teams who played one round match for the title.

Final list 

* M: Matches W: Win D: Drawn L: Lost G+: Goals earned G-: Goals got P: Point

2. Class 

1. NSC, 2. Szegedi VSE, 3. NTE, 4. Tatabányai SC.

References 
Gyarmati Dezső: Aranykor (Hérodotosz Könyvkiadó és Értékesítő Bt., Budapest, 2002.)
Magyar Sport Almanach 1937-1939

1938 in water polo
1938 in Hungarian sport
Seasons in Hungarian water polo competitions